is a 1991 Japanese horror film directed by Kazuo Komizu.  It stars Cutie Suzuki as a survivor of a zombie apocalypse in Tokyo.

Plot 
After a meteor lands, the population of Tokyo transforms into flesh-eating zombies, and the military quarantines the city.  A survivor, Keiko, fights her way through the city and attempts to defeat General Hugioka's evil mercenaries, who indiscriminately kill both humans and zombies.

Cast 
 Cutie Suzuki as Keiko
 Kera
 Heiko Hayase
 Kenji Ohtsuki

Release 
Synapse Films released Battle Girl on DVD on February 23, 2010.

Reception 
Bill Gibron of DVD Talk rated it 2/5 stars and called it a boring attempt to imitate Troma Entertainment.  David Johnson of DVD Verdict wrote, "I don't know how you screw up a movie about a zombie-killing girl played by a professional wrestler, but the folks behind Battle Girl perfected the formula. Simply put, this is one of the most boring, nonsensical, bloodsucker excursions I've seen."  Writing in The Zombie Movie Encyclopedia, academic Peter Dendle said that the "low-budget effects and goofy costumes are devastating for a science fiction apocalypse feature such as this one".

References

External links 
 

1991 films
1991 horror films
1990s science fiction horror films
Japanese post-apocalyptic films
Japanese zombie films
1990s Japanese-language films